Sander Sagosen (born 14 September 1995) is a Norwegian handball player for THW Kiel and the Norwegian national team.

He has previously played for Kolstad IF, Haslum HK, Aalborg Håndbold and Paris Saint-Germain.

Honours
German Championship:
: 2021
German Cup:
: 2022
French Championship:
: 2018, 2019, 2020
Danish Championship:
: 2017
World Championship:
: 2017, 2019
 European Championship:
: 2020
  EHF Champions League:
: 2020

Individual awards
Handball-Planet – Best World Handball Player: 2018
All-Star Left back of the World Championship: 2017, 2019
All-Star Left back of the European Championship: 2020
All-Star Centre back of the European Championship: 2016, 2018
Top scorer of the European Championship: 2020 (65 goals)
All-Star Left Back of the EHF Champions League: 2020
All-Star Centre Back of the EHF Champions League: 2018
Top Goalscorer of the Danish Handball League: 2017
The World Young Player 2014/2015 (by the Internet side Handball-Planet.com)
The World Young Player 2015/2016 (by the Internet side Handball-Planet.com)
The World Young Player 2016/2017 (by the Internet side Handball-Planet.com)

Personal life
He is married to former fellow handballer Hanna Bredal Oftedal.

References

External links
 
 
 Sander Sagosen at the Norwegian Handball Federation 
 
 

1995 births
Living people
Norwegian male handball players
Kolstad Håndball players
Aalborg Håndbold players
Expatriate handball players
Norwegian expatriate sportspeople in Denmark
Norwegian expatriate sportspeople in France
Norwegian expatriate sportspeople in Germany
Sportspeople from Stavanger
Handball-Bundesliga players
THW Kiel players
Handball players at the 2020 Summer Olympics
Olympic handball players of Norway